Davide Zoboli (born 8 October 1981, in Parma) is an Italian former association footballer who played as a defender.

In June 2002, he was exchanged with Alex Gibbs of Monza.

He was signed by Brescia in July 2004, and made his Serie A debut on 26 September 2004, against Udinese Calcio.

References

External links
http://www.gazzetta.it/speciali/2008/calcio/Players/player_p183319.shtml

1981 births
Living people
Italian footballers
Italy youth international footballers
Parma Calcio 1913 players
Benevento Calcio players
A.C. Monza players
U.C. AlbinoLeffe players
Brescia Calcio players
Torino F.C. players
Modena F.C. players
Serie A players
Serie B players
Association football defenders
Sportspeople from Parma
Footballers from Emilia-Romagna